Richard Gordon Wilson (born August 10, 1950) is a Canadian former professional ice hockey defenceman and head coach. Wilson was mostly recently an assistant coach for the Philadelphia Flyers of the National Hockey League (NHL).

Playing career
Wilson was drafted by the Montreal Canadiens in the 1970 NHL Amateur Draft, sixty-sixth overall. He played for the AHL Nova Scotia Voyageurs, Montreal Canadiens, St. Louis Blues, Detroit Red Wings and AHL Philadelphia Firebirds.

Coaching career
He was an assistant coach for the University of North Dakota Fighting Sioux hockey team, Prince Albert Raiders, New York Islanders, Los Angeles Kings and Dallas Stars. He was also an acting head coach between January 25, 2002, and May 2002 for the Dallas Stars. He won the Memorial Cup in 1985. He won the Stanley Cup in 1999. On August 10, 2010 Wilson was named assistant coach for the Minnesota Wild organization, a position he held until the conclusion of the 2015-16 season.

He is also the father of former NHL forward Landon Wilson.

Career statistics

Coaching statistics

Awards and honours

References

External links

1950 births
Living people
Canadian ice hockey defencemen
Dallas Stars coaches
Detroit Red Wings players
Ice hockey people from Saskatchewan
Los Angeles Kings coaches
Minnesota North Stars coaches
Minnesota Wild coaches
Montreal Canadiens draft picks
Montreal Canadiens players
New York Islanders coaches
North Dakota Fighting Hawks men's ice hockey coaches
North Dakota Fighting Hawks men's ice hockey players
Nova Scotia Voyageurs players
Philadelphia Firebirds (AHL) players
Philadelphia Flyers coaches
Prince Albert Raiders coaches
St. Louis Blues coaches
St. Louis Blues players
Sportspeople from Prince Albert, Saskatchewan
Stanley Cup champions
Tampa Bay Lightning coaches
Canadian ice hockey coaches